Chris Murphy (born 1973) is a United States Senator from Connecticut.

Chris or Christopher Murphy may also refer to:

Musicians
 Chris Murphy (manager) (1954–2021), Australian band manager and music entrepreneur
 Chris Murphy (Canadian musician) (born 1968), member of the band Sloan
 Chris Murphy (Australian singer) (born 1976), Australian Idol finalist in 2006
 Chris Murphy (British musician), member of the British ska band Spunge
 Chris Murphy (violinist), American violinist, band leader and composer

Politicians
 Christopher Murphy (British politician) (born 1947), British politician
 Chris Murphy (South Carolina politician) (born 1968), member of the South Carolina House of Representatives

Sportspeople
 Chris Murphy (hurler) (born 1985), Irish hurler
 Chris Murphy (baseball) (born 1998), American baseball player

Other
 Christopher Murphy (designer), British designer, writer and educator